Common Rider/Against All Authority Split is a split album featuring songs by American bands Against All Authority and Common Rider.

Track listing
 "Lied To" (Against All Authority)
 "War Machine Breakdown" (Against All Authority)
 "Barricades" (Against All Authority)
 "World Dominator" (Against All Authority)
 "Where the Waves Are Highest" (Common Rider)
 "Dogtown" (Common Rider)
 "Blue Spark" (Common Rider)
 "The Only Ones" (Common Rider)

War Machine Breakdown is a different version than that featured on The Restoration of Chaos & Order

References

Against All Authority albums
2005 EPs
Split EPs
Hopeless Records EPs